Big Spring Creek is a  tributary of Conodoguinet Creek in Cumberland County, Pennsylvania in the United States.

See also
List of rivers of Pennsylvania

References

External links
U.S. Geological Survey: PA stream gaging stations

 
Note: Big Spring Creek is in the Lower Susquehanna River subbasin, but is not included above because its watershed area is less than 100 km². 

Rivers of Pennsylvania
Tributaries of the Susquehanna River
Rivers of Cumberland County, Pennsylvania